Parks Peak, at  above sea level is a peak in the Sawtooth Range of Idaho. The peak is located in the Sawtooth Wilderness of Sawtooth National Recreation Area on the border of Blaine and Custer counties. Farley Lake is north of the peak and Bowknot and Toxaway lakes are west of the peak.

References 

Mountains of Blaine County, Idaho
Mountains of Custer County, Idaho
Mountains of Idaho
Sawtooth Wilderness